Jacinto Hernández Zulueta (September 11, 1940 – October 12, 2019) was a Cuban professional baseball player and coach.

Baseball career
Hernández began his professional baseball career with Almendares in the Cuban Winter League, spending the 1960-1961 season on that team's reserve list. When the Cuban government banned professional baseball after the end of the season, Almendares's general manager Monchy de Arcos, who was also a scout for the Cleveland Indians, helped Hernández secure a contract with the latter organization.

Hernández entered the Indians' farm system as a catcher, and in 1961, he caught Tommy John's first professional game while the two were with the Dubuque Packers. Later, Indians scout Hoot Evers suggested that Hernández's strong throwing arm would be better used at shortstop, and for the next several years Hernández worked to learn the infield. He was released by the Indians on May 15, 1965 and signed by the California Angels, who promoted him to the major leagues later that year at the age of 25. Hernández remained with the Angels until April 10, 1967, when he was chosen as the player to be named later in a December 2, 1966 deal that sent Dean Chance to the Minnesota Twins in exchange for Pete Cimino, Jimmie Hall, and Don Mincher. Hernández served as a utility infielder for the Twins in 1967 and 1968, but was left unprotected in the 1968 expansion draft, and the new Kansas City Royals chose him with the 43rd pick.

Hernández served as the Royals' everyday shortstop in their inaugural season, and received the plurality of the starts at that position in 1970, sharing time with Rich Severson and Tommy Matchick. 

He was traded along with Bob Johnson and Jim Campanis from the Royals to the Pirates for Freddie Patek, Bruce Dal Canton and Jerry May at the Winter Meetings on December 2, 1970. Initially slated to play in a reserve role, Hernández became the Pirates' regular shortstop after Gene Alley sustained an injury. On September 1, 1971, Hernández was part of a notable milestone when, for the first time in baseball history, a team fielded a lineup that consisted entirely of African-American and Latino players. Orioles manager Earl Weaver memorably said that "The Pirates can’t win the pennant with Hernandez at shortstop," but Hernandez started all seven games in the 1971 World Series and committed no errors, even successfully handling the ground ball that became the final out of Game 7.

Hernandez's role decreased in subsequent seasons, and the Pirates traded him to the Philadelphia Phillies for Mike Ryan in January 1974. Hernández never saw Major League action with the Phillies, however; he returned to the Pirates organization and played for their Triple-A team in 1974. He followed by playing in Mexico in 1975 and 1976.

After Hernández's retirement as a player, he remained involved with baseball as a coach, including a stint on the staff of the New Jersey Jackals in 2001. He died from cancer on October 12, 2019 at age 79.

References

External links

Jackie Hernández at SABR (Baseball BioProject)
Pura Pelota

1940 births
2019 deaths
Águilas del Zulia players
Burlington Indians players (1958–1964)
California Angels players
Cardenales de Lara players
Cuban expatriate baseball players in Venezuela
Cardenales de Villahermosa players
Charleston Charlies players
Charleston Indians players
Deaths from cancer in Florida
Cuban people of African descent
Denver Bears players
Dubuque Packers players
Kansas City Royals players
Leones de Ponce players
Cuban expatriate baseball players in Puerto Rico
Major League Baseball players from Cuba
Cuban expatriate baseball players in the United States
Major League Baseball shortstops
Minnesota Twins players
Minor league baseball managers
Northern League (baseball, 1993–2010) managers
People from Perico, Cuba
Pittsburgh Pirates players
Portland Beavers players
Seattle Angels players
Tecolotes de Nuevo Laredo players
Tigres de Aragua players
Cuban expatriate baseball players in Mexico